Walter Edward Bagnall  (1903–1984) was a Canadian Anglican bishop

Born in Birr, County Offaly, Ireland in 1903 and educated at the University of Western Ontario he was ordained in 1928. He was  Curate of All Saints, Windsor and then held incumbencies at St Mark's, London, St John's, Preston, All Saints, Hamilton and  St George's, St Catharines. He was Dean of Niagara from 1947 to 1949 and then its diocesan bishop until his retirement in 1973. He died in 1984.

References 

1903 births
University of Western Ontario alumni
Deans of Niagara
Anglican bishops of Niagara
20th-century Anglican Church of Canada bishops
1984 deaths